Heterocoma is a genus of flowering plants in the aster family, Asteraceae.

Heterocoma was believed for many years to contain only one species, until 2013, when two new species were described and the three genera Bishopalea, Sipolisia, and Xerxes were merged into Heterocoma. All are endemic to the Brazilian Highlands.

Species:

 formerly included
Heterocoma bifrons (DC. ex Pers.) DC. - Chronopappus bifrons (DC. ex Pers.) DC.

References

Vernonieae
Asteraceae genera
Endemic flora of Brazil